Tarik Benhabiles was the defending champion but lost in the second round to Thomas Muster.

Muster won in the final, 6–1, 6–7(3-7), 6–2, against Guillermo Pérez Roldán.

Seeds

  Guillermo Pérez Roldán (final)
  Thomas Muster (champion)
  Goran Prpić (semifinals)
  Martin Střelba (first round)
  Paul Haarhuis (first round)
  Tomás Carbonell (semifinals)
  Mark Koevermans (quarterfinals)
  Franco Davín (second round)

Draw

Finals

Top half

Bottom half

External links
 1990 Casablanca Open draw

Singles